Derek Andrew Hay (born 12 August 1964), also known by his stage name Ben English, is a British pornographic actor and the founder and owner of the adult talent agencies LA Direct Models and Miamp Direct Models. He semi-retired from performing in the late 2000s after appearing in nearly 800 movies. However, he has since then appeared in several movies. He appeared most recently in Digital Playground's Trading Mothers for Daughters, released on 10 August 2014.

Before founding LA Direct Models in 2000, Hay worked as a stage manager in London for acts including The Rolling Stones, Queen, and Metallica.

As of 2020, several accounts of sexual abuse, trafficking, and employment standards violations have been lobbied against the LA Direct Models agency and Hay.

Hay, along with Dwight Cunningham and Karine Michmichian of The Luxury Companion, has also been formally charged by the California Department of Justice for an alleged participation in an illegal prostitution scheme. The complaint alleges that Hay would introduce clients of LA Direct Models to Michmichian and Cunningham for the purpose of prostitution. The complaint further alleges that Hay pressured a female client into prostitution by using the exclusivity provisions in one of his contracts to limit her access to work in pornography.

Awards
 2004 XRCO Award – Best New Stud
 2004 AVN Award – Best Male Newcomer
 2009 AVN Award – Best Supporting Actor (Pirates II: Stagnetti's Revenge)
 2014 AVN Hall of Fame

See also
 List of British pornographic actors
 Jenna Presley, notable actress managed by Hay

References

External links
  (Derek Hay)
  (Derek Hay)
  (Derek Hay)
 Adult FYI

English male pornographic film actors
People from Lincolnshire
1964 births
Living people